<noinclude>

Anne of Kiev or Anna Yaroslavna (c. 1030 – 1075) was a Rus' princess who became Queen of France in 1051 upon marrying King Henry I. She ruled the kingdom as regent during the minority of their son Philip I from Henry's death in 1060 until her controversial marriage to Count Ralph IV of Valois. Anne founded the Abbey of St. Vincent at Senlis.

Childhood

Anne was a daughter of Yaroslav the Wise, Grand Prince of Kiev and Prince of Novgorod, and his second wife Ingegerd Olofsdotter of Sweden. Her exact birthdate is unknown; Philippe Delorme has suggested 1027, while Andrew Gregorovich has proposed 1032, citing a mention in a Kievan chronicle of the birth of a daughter to Yaroslav in that year.

Anne's exact place in the birth order of her siblings is unknown, although she was almost certainly the youngest daughter. Little is known about Anne's childhood or education. It is assumed that she was literate, at least enough to write her name, because her signature in Cyrillic exists on a document from 1061. Delorme has pointed out that Yaroslav founded a number of schools in his kingdom and suggests that education was highly valued in his family, leading him to propose a significant level of education for Anne. Gregorovich has suggested that Anne learned French in preparation for her marriage to King Henry I of France.

Engagement 
The negotiations for Anne's marriage to the 18-years-older King Henry took place in the late 1040s, after the death of Henry's first wife, Matilda of Frisia, and their only child. Due to the pressing need for an heir, and the Church's growing disapproval of consanguineous marriages, it became necessary for Henry to seek an unrelated bride. The Kievan Rus' was not unknown to the French. Yaroslav had married several of his children to Western rulers in an attempt to avoid the influence of the Byzantine Empire.

In the autumn of 1049 or the spring of 1050, Henry sent Bishop Gauthier of Meaux, Goscelin of Chauny, and other unnamed advisors to Yaroslav's court. It is possible that there were two diplomatic missions to the Rus at this time, with Roger of Chalons also present. No record of the marriage negotiations or the dowry arrangements survives, although Anne reportedly left Kiev with "rich presents". Gregorovich claims that part of the wealth she brought to France included the jacinth jewel that Abbot Suger later mounted on a reliquary of St. Denis. Anne left Kiev in the summer or fall of 1050 and traveled to Reims.

Queenship 

Anne married Henry on 19 May 1051, during the feast of Pentecost. Henry was nearly twenty years older than Anne. Her wedding on 19 May 1051 followed the installation of Lietbert as bishop of Cambrai, and Anne was crowned immediately following the marriage ceremony, making her the first French queen to celebrate her coronation in Reims Cathedral.

Anne and Henry were married for nine years and had three sons: Philip, Robert (who died young), and Hugh. Anne is often credited with introducing the Greek name "Philip" to royal families of Western Europe, as she bestowed it on her first son; she might have imported this Greek name from her Eastern Orthodox culture. There may also have been a daughter, Emma, perhaps born in 1055; it is unknown if she married or when she died. Henry and Anne of Kiev are additionally said to have been the parents of the beatified figure Edigna.

As queen, Anne would have had the privilege of participating in the royal council, but there are almost no records of her doing so. In one 1058 charter, Henry granted a privilege to a couple of villages associated with the monastery of Saint-Maur-des-Fossés doing so "with the approval of my wife Anne and our children Philip, Robert, and Hugh." Anne seems to have possessed territories in the same region under the terms of her dower.

In 1059, King Henry began feuding with the Church over issues related to Gregorian Reform. During this time, Pope Nicholas II sent Queen Anne a letter counselling her to follow her conscience to right wrongs and intervene against oppressive violence, while also encouraging her to advocate with her husband so that he might govern with moderation. According to Delorme, some historians have interpreted this letter from the Pope as being indicative of Anne's conversion to Roman Catholicism from Eastern Orthodoxy.

Regency 

Upon Henry's death on 4 August 1060, Philip succeeded to the throne. Count Baldwin V of Flanders, the husband of Henry's sister  Adela, was assigned as Philip's guardian. Anne may still have played an active role in government at that point; an act from 1060 shows her name following Philip's, and her name appears in four times as many charters as Baldwin's. She also hired Philip's tutor, who was known at court by a Greek title.

The signature was most likely placed by a  Rus' assistant of the Queen. Under the king's rubric, there is a cross and eight letters in Cyrillic, probably meaning "Ana Reina", the  contemporaneous French for "Queen Anne". Evidence for Anne's role in government, however, disappears in 1061, around the time she remarried. Her second husband was Count Ralph IV of Valois. This marriage was controversial because of the couple's  affinity (as Ralph was Henry's cousin), and it constituted bigamy, since Ralph was still technically married to his second wife, Haquenez. Ralph was excommunicated for these transgressions. King Philip's advisers may have encouraged him to turn away from his mother, perhaps mistrusting Ralph's influence. Ralph began referring to himself as the king's stepfather in the late 1060s. He died in 1074, leaving Anne a widow once again.

In 1062, Anne gave a significant amount of money to restore a dilapidated chapel at Senlis, originally dedicated to Saint Vincent of Saragossa. She bequeathed lands and income to the new establishment so that the organization could sustain itself. She also wrote a letter explaining her reasons for dedicating the monastery. The letter betrays adherence to Greek Orthodox theology. For instance, the term "Mary, mother of God" is used rather than the more common "Our Lady", perhaps referring to the Eastern concept of the Theotokos. Some scholars believe that Anne did not write this letter herself.

Death and aftermath 

The exact date of Anne's death is unknown. Delorme believes that she died on 5 September—the day commemorated at Senlis—in 1075 (the year of her last signed document), while others have proposed 1080. A terminus ante quem is provided by a 1089 document of Philip I, which indicates that Anne had died by then.

In 1682, the Jesuit antiquary Claude-Francois Menestrier announced that he had discovered Anne's tomb at the Cistercian Abbey of Villiers. The discovery was subsequently disputed, as Villiers was not built until the thirteenth century, although it's possible Anne's remains had been moved there at some point following her death. Whatever monument may have been there was destroyed in the French Revolution.

In the 18th and 19th centuries, increased diplomatic contact between France and Russia led to a revived antiquarian interest in Anne, and a number of short biographies were published. In the 20th century, Anne became a symbol of Ukrainian nationalism. On the other hand, a film was produced in the Soviet Union, "Yaroslavna, the Queen of France" (1978), which was not related with "Ukrainian nationalism" in any way. An opera called "Anna Yaroslavna", written by Antin Rudnytsky, was first performed at Carnegie Hall in 1969. In 1998, the Ukrainian government issued a postage stamp in her honour. In 2005, the Government of Ukraine sponsored the construction of a bronze statue of Queen Anne at Senlis, which was unveiled by President Viktor Yushchenko on 22 June.

Notes

References

Bibliography
 
 Bauthier, Robert-Henri. 'Anne de Kiev reine de France et la politique royale au Xe siècle', Revue des Etudes Slaves, vol.57 (1985), pp. 543–45
 Bogomoletz, Wladimir V. Anna of Kiev. An enigmatic Capetian Queen of the eleventh century. A reassessment of biographical sources. In: French History. Jg. 19, Nr. 3, 2005,
 Bouyer, Christian: Dictionnaire des Reines de France. Perrin, Paris 1992, S. 135–137.
Dauxois, Jacqueline. Anne de Kiev. Reine de France. Paris: Presse de la Renaissance, 2003. .
 de Caix de Saint-Aymour, Amédée. Anne de Russie, reine de France et comtesse de Valois au XIe siècle. Paris: Honoré Champion, 1896.
 
 Hallu, Roger. Anne de Kiev, reine de France. Rome: Editiones Universitatis catholicae Ucrainorum, 1973.

Lobanov-Rostovskii, Aleksandr Iakovlevich (1825). Recueil de Pièces Historiques sur la reine Anne ou Agnès, épouse de Henri Ier, Roi De France, et Fille de Iarosslaf Ier, Grand Duc de Russie. Paris: Typ. De Firmin Didot, 1825.
Megan McLaughlin, Sex, Gender, and Episcopal Authority in an Age of Reform, 1000–1122. Cambridge University Press, 2010.

 Sokol, Edward D.: Anna of Rus, Queen of France. In The New Review. A Journal of East European History. Nr. 13, 1973, S. 3–13.
 Treffer, Gerd: Die französischen Königinnen. Von Bertrada bis Marie Antoinette (8.–18. Jahrhundert). Pustet, Regensburg 1996, S. 81–83.
 Ward, Emily Joan. "Anne of Kiev (c.1024-c.1075) and a reassessment of maternal power in the minority kingship of Philip I of France," published on 8 March 2016, Institute of Historical Research, London University.
 Woll, Carsten. Die Königinnen des hochmittelalterlichen Frankreich 987-1237/38 (= Historische Forschungen. Band 24). Franz Steiner, Stuttgart 2002, S. 109–116.

External links 

 Pope Nicholas II's 1059 letter to Anne, translated at Epistolae
 Women's Biography: Anne of Kiev

|-

1030 births
1075 deaths
Year of birth uncertain
House of Capet
French queens consort
11th-century women rulers
Regents of France
11th-century French people
11th-century French women
Kievan Rus' princesses
Remarried royal consorts
French people of Russian descent
French people of Ukrainian descent
People from Kyiv
Rurik dynasty
11th-century Rus' people
11th-century Rus' women
French people of Swedish descent
Queen mothers